The 1998 European Challenge Cup Final was the final match of the 1997–98 European Challenge Cup, the second season of Europe's second tier club rugby union competition. The match was played on 2 February 1998 at Les Sept Deniers in Toulouse.

The match was contested by Colomiers and SU Agen, who are both from France. Colomiers won the match 43–5; scoring 7 tries including a double from flanker Bernard de Giusti. They did concede 1 try, scored by second rower Christophe Porcu.

Match details

See also
1997–98 European Challenge Cup

References

Final
1998
1997–98 in French rugby union
US Colomiers matches
SU Agen Lot-et-Garonne